The Standing Orders Committee (Malay: Jawatankuasa Peraturan Mesyuarat; ; Tamil: மலேசிய குடிமக்களுக்கான ஸ்டாண்டிங் கமிட்டி) is a select committee of the House of Representatives in the Parliament of Malaysia. The remit of the committee is to consider from time to time and report on all matters relating to the Standing Orders which may be referred to it by the House.

Membership

14th Parliament
As of April 2019, the members of the committee are as follows:

Former members of the committee are as follows:

See also
Parliamentary Committees of Malaysia

Notes

References

External links
STANDING ORDERS COMMITTEE

Parliament of Malaysia
Committees of the Parliament of Malaysia
Committees of the Dewan Rakyat